The list of North Carolina State University people includes all alumni, faculty, and chief executives of North Carolina State University.

Alumni, faculty, and former students

Academics
Annie Antón (professor 1998–2012), professor of software engineering and founder of ThePrivacyPlace 
David E. Aspnes (professor 1992–present), Distinguished University Professor and member of the National Academy of Sciences
William Brantley Aycock (B.S. Education 1936), former University of North Carolina at Chapel Hill Chancellor
John Balaban (professor ca. 2000–present), poet
Donald Bitzer (professor 1989–present), father of plasma television
Frank A Buckless (professor 1989–present), KPMG Professor and Department Head of Accounting at North Carolina State University’s Poole College of Management
Albert Carnesale (PhD Nuclear Engineering 1966; faculty member 1962–1969), UCLA Chancellor
Carol Fowler Durham (Ed.D. Adult Education 2009), Professor of Nursing and medical simulation leader at University of North Carolina at Chapel Hill
Donald J. Farish (M.S. Entomology, 1966), biologist and president of Rowan University
Steven Kuehl (M.S. 1982; Ph.D. 1983), professor of marine geology
Blake Ragsdale Van Leer, former Dean of Engineering at North Carolina State University and president of Georgia Tech
William C. Friday (B.S. Textile Engineering 1941), former President of the University of North Carolina
Eduardo Halfon, Guatemalan writer
John Kessel (professor 1982–present), science-fiction author
Dorianne Laux (professor ca. 2008–present), poet
Trudy Mackay (professor 1987–present), quantitative geneticist, winner of the Wolf Prize in Agriculture in 2016
Gwen Pearson (graduate biology alumni 1992)
Tom Regan (professor 1967–present), philosopher and animal rights activist
John M. Riddle (professor ca. 1965–2005), historian and author of Eve's Herbs
Robert Rodman (professor 1973–present), professor of computer science, author of Introduction to Language 
Mary Schweitzer (professor 2003–present), paleontologist
Charles Edward Stevens (professor 1980–1992), professor and expert in comparative physiology and digestive systems
Lisa M. Porter (PhD materials science 1993), Professor of Materials Science at Carnegie Mellon University
Rodney Waschka II (professor 1990–present), composer
Gregory Washington (PhD Mechanical Engineering 1994), dean of the Henry Samueli School of Engineering at University of California, Irvine
R. V. Young (professor), Renaissance English literature scholar, co-founder of the John Donne Journal
Elizabeth Whittaker, architect, founder of Merge Architects and Associate Professor in Practice of Architecture at Harvard University's Graduate School of Design

Athletics
 

Abdul-Malik Abu (born 1995), basketball player in the Israeli Premier Basketball League
Nazmi Albadawi, midfielder for NASL club Carolina Railhawks 
Debbie Antonelli, (Business Management and Economics 1986) basketball broadcaster and analyst
BeeJay Anya, (2017 graduate), 2015 ACC Sixth Man of the year, current Free Agent
Thurl Bailey (1983), former NBA player
Cat Barber, NBA player, attended (2013–2016)
Joan Benoit, won the first Women's Olympic Marathon at the 1984 Olympic Games in Los Angeles; former world record holder in the marathon; member of US Olympic Hall of Fame
Andrew Brackman (2005), pitcher for the Cincinnati Reds
Jacoby Brissett, NFL quarterback for Indianapolis Colts
Dario Brose (1992), former professional soccer player for France and Germany, San Jose Earthquakes; 1992 Olympic Soccer team
Lorenzo Brown (born 1990), basketball player in the Israeli Basketball Premier League, formerly in the NBA
Ted Brown (American football) (born 1957), football player, Minnesota Vikings
Darrion Caldwell (2011), 2009 national wrestling champion at 149lbs; professional mixed martial artist, competing for Bellator MMA
Alan-Michael Cash, defensive tackle for the Montreal Alouettes
Tim Clark, PGA Tour golfer; winner of the Players Championship in 2010
Chris Colmer (2005), offensive lineman for the Tampa Bay Buccaneers
Chris Corchiani (1991), former NBA player
Jerricho Cotchery (2004), football player, Carolina Panthers
Bill Cowher (B.S. Education 1979), football, former head coach of the Pittsburgh Steelers
Vinny Del Negro (1988), former NBA Head Coach of the Los Angeles Clippers
Jonathan Diaz, MLB player for the Toronto Blue Jays.
 Ashley Fliehr (B.S. Public Relations 2008), better known as Charlotte Flair, WWE wrestler
Johnny Evans (American football), NFL and CFL quarterback and punter. Current radio sportscaster for NC State football.
David Fox (B.S. Civil Engineering 1994), 1996 Olympic swimmer
Lennard Freeman (born 1995), basketball player in the Israeli Basketball Premier League
Roman Gabriel (B.S. Education 1962), football player
Mike Glennon, NFL quarterback
Bubba Green, former NFL lineman
Tom Gugliotta (1992), former NBA player
Frank Harris, former National Football League player, Chicago Bears
Lloyd Harrison (B.S. Business 2000), retired National Football League player
J.J. Hickson (attended 2007–2008), NBA player
Julius Hodge (B.A. Communications 2005), NBA player, Denver Nuggets, No. 20 pick in the 2005 NBA draft
Terrence Holt (B.A. Sociology 2004, attended 1999–2001), football player
Cole Holcomb (2019), NFL linebacker
Torry Holt (B.A. Sociology 1998), retired National Football League player
Richard Howell (born 1990), American-Israeli basketball player for Hapoel Tel Aviv of the Israeli Basketball Premier League
John Huzvar, football player
Cullen Jones, 2008 Olympic gold medalist, 4x100 freestyle relay; 2012 Olympic gold medalist, 4x100 medley relay 
Markell Johnson (2020 graduate), professional basketball player
Trevor Lacey, Attended (2014–2015) Professional basketball player for Dinamo Sassari
Manny Lawson (B.S. Industrial Engineering 2006), football player, Buffalo Bills
Justine Lindsay, first transgender National Football League cheerleader, Carolina TopCats
Sean Locklear (2004), NFL offensive lineman for the Seattle Seahawks
Sidney Lowe (1983), former NBA player; former head coach of the North Carolina State University basketball team 
Cody Martin (attended 2014–2016), NBA player
Caleb Martin (attended 2014–2016), NBA player
Pablo Mastroeni (attended 1994–1997), soccer player, Miami Fusion and Colorado Rapids; represented the US in the FIFA World Cup in 2002 and 2006
Cory Mazzoni, MLB player for the San Diego Padres.
Nate McMillan (attended 1985–1986), former NBA player; former head coach of the Portland Trail Blazers
Cozell McQueen, Starting Center on 1983 NCAA Championship Team 
Joe Milinichik, former National Football League player, Detroit Lions, Los Angeles Rams and San Diego Chargers
Colt Morton, former baseball catcher for the San Diego Padres and player for the Sugar Land Skeeters.
Chuck Nevitt (1982), former NBA player
Les Palmer, football player
Carl Pettersson, PGA Tour golfer 
Dan Plesac, Former MLB player, 3x All-star
Mike Quick (1982), former star NFL wide receiver for the Philadelphia Eagles (1982–90), and current Eagles' radio broadcaster 
Carlos Rodón, Pitcher for Chicago White Sox
Tab Ramos (attended 1984–1987, B.A. Foreign Language and Literature 2003), soccer player, MetroStars; represented the US in the FIFA World Cup in 1990, 1994, and 1998
Lamont Reid (B.S. PRT 2005), NFL player, Denver Broncos
Mike Reid, NFL defensive back Philadelphia Eagles
Philip Rivers (B.S. Business 2003), football player, San Diego Chargers, No. 4 pick in the 2004 NFL Draft
Dave Robertson, former MLB player, 1922 World Series Champion.
Koren Robinson, football player, Green Bay Packers, No. 9 pick in the 2001 NFL Draft
Joe Scarpati, football player, Green Bay Packers, holder for Tom Dempsey's record breaking 63-yard field goal
Scott Schweitzer, professional soccer player
Cedric Simmons (attended 2004–2006), NBA player, Chicago Bulls; No. 15 pick in the 2006 NBA draft 
Dennis Smith Jr., (attended 2016–17), 2016–2017 ACC Rookie of the Year, No. 9 overall pick in the 2017 NBA draft, NBA player for the Detroit Pistons.
Vic Sorrell (head baseball coach 1946–1966), played 10 seasons in Major League Baseball
Doug Strange, retired Major League Baseball player
Craig Sutherland, professional soccer player
Sylvester Terkay, professional wrestler 
Joe Thuney, NFL player for the New England Patriots.
Pat Thomas, football player, Omaha Nighthawks
Pete Thomas, football player
David Thompson (B.A. Sociology 2003, attended 1971–1975), retired NBA and ABA player
Jim Toman (B.A. Vocational Industrial Education 1985, M.A. Sports Management 1995), college baseball coach at Liberty
Trea Turner, MLB player for Washington Nationals. 
Jim Valvano, head coach of Men's Basketball for NC State's National Championship (1983)
Fernandus Vinson, NFL player
T. J. Warren (attended 2012–2014), NBA player, Indiana Pacers; won 2014 ACC Player of the Year
Spud Webb (attended 1983–1984), NBA player, Atlanta Hawks; won 1986 NBA Slam Dunk Contest
C. J. Williams (born 1990), basketball player in the Israeli Basketball Premier League
Mario Williams (attended 2003–2005), football player, Houston Texans, Buffalo Bills; No. 1 pick in the 2006 NFL Draft
Adrian Wilson (attended 1998–2001), football player, Arizona Cardinals
Russell Wilson (2010 graduate), NFL football player, Seattle Seahawks, Super Bowl Champion.
Tracy Woodson, retired Major League Baseball player

Business
 Henry E. Bonitz (1893), architect; one of the first to attend and graduate from NCSU
 Jim Goodnight (Bachelor's in Applied Mathematics, Master's and Doctorate in Statistics from NCSU), Co-Founder & CEO SAS
 Hal Lawton (1996), President & CEO of Tractor Supply
 Mohamed Mansour (Textiles, 1968) Egyptian businessman and politician; chairman of Mansour Group
 James W. Owens (1968, MT 1970, PhD 1973), Former CEO and Chairman of Caterpillar Inc.
 Dr. John Townsend (1977, BA), award-winning author and consultant of leadership and organizational coaching
 John Widman (1984), luthier
 Jeff Williams (circa 1985 Bachelor's in mechanical engineering), COO of Apple Inc.
 Edgar S. Woolard Jr. (1956, Industrial Engineering), CEO of DuPont

Media and entertainment
 

Randy Boone (attended early 1960s), actor and singer
Amanda Busick (B.S. Entrepreneurship major 2008), sideline/pit reporter and host for FOX Sports and Motor Trend
Brett Claywell (B.S. Architecture 2001), actor
John H. Davis (Mechanical & Aerospace Engineering 1970), host and creator of the PBS television program MotorWeek since the program's inception in 1981
Zach Galifianakis (Communication and Film major circa 1987; did not graduate), comedian, actor, writer
Terry Gannon (B.A. History 1985), ABC sports commentator an member of the 1983 NCAA Championship Team
Connie B. Gay (B.S. Agricultural Education 1935), music executive and founding president of the Country Music Association  
Michael Gracz (B.S. Business 2004), professional poker player
Chris Hondros, war photographer; killed in Libya on April 20, 2011
Brian Heidik, Winner of Survivor: Thailand
Tim Kirkman (B.E.D. Design 1990), film writer, director
Scotty McCreery, American Idol champion; country singer
Rhett McLaughlin (Civil Engineering 2000), Internet personality
Link Neal (Industrial Engineering 2001), Internet personality
Ken Matthews (B.A. in Political Science 1984), radio show host, professional speaker
A.D. Miles (B.A. Communications 1992), Head Writer, The Tonight Show Starring Jimmy Fallon
Rapsody, American rapper and songwriter
Roy H. Park (B.A. 1931), communications executive
T. R. Pearson (B.A. and M.A. in English), novelist
Jerry Punch (B.S. Pre-Med 1975), sideline reporter and auto racing analyst for ESPN and ABC
Jon Reep (B.A. Communications, 1996), comedian and winner of NBC's Last Comic Standing, season 5 (2007)
Leah Roberts, Spanish and anthropology major; withdrew at end of 1999 and disappeared on a trip to Washington state in March 2000
John Tesh (B.A. Communication 1975), musician, television presenter
Tab Thacker (B.A. Criminal Justice), Police Academy actor; NCAA champion wrestler
Lara Trump (B.A. Communications 2005), television host and producer; daughter-in-law of the 45th U.S. President, Donald Trump
Jill Wagner (B.A. Management 2001), actress

Military
Major General William C. Lee (B.S. 1917), first Commander of the 101st Airborne Division.
Eli L. Whiteley (M.S. 1948), Medal of Honor recipient
General Maxwell R. Thurman (B.S. Chemical Engineering 1953), US Army general; Vice Chief of Staff of the U.S. Army; first four-star officer at NCSU
General Hugh Shelton (B.S. Textile Technology 1963), former chairman of the U.S. Armed Forces Joint Chiefs of Staff
Lieutenant General Buster Glosson (B.S. Electrical Engineering 1965), U.S. Air Force, Deputy Chief of Staff for plans and operations of U.S. Air Force, Washington DC. During the Gulf War, commanded the 14th Air Division (Provisional); director of campaign plans for U.S. Central Command Air Forces, Riyadh, Saudi Arabia
General Dan K. McNeill (B.S. 1968), Commander of NATO International Security Assistance Force
Lieutenant General William E. Ingram Jr. (B.S. 1970), United States Army Director of the Army National Guard
Vice Admiral Joseph Aucoin (B.S. 1980), Commander U.S. Seventh Fleet
General Anthony J. Cotton (B.A. 1986), USAF, Commander Air Force Global Strike Command
Admiral Daryl L. Caudle (B.S. 1985), Commander United States Fleet Forces Command
General Raymond Odierno (M.S. Nuclear Effects Engineering), Chief of Staff of the United States Army; Commanding General, Multi-national Force, Iraq; Commanding General Fort Hood and U.S. Army III Corps
John Ray Webster, Captain in the U.S. Army
Blake Wayne Van Leer, Commander and Captain in the U.S. Navy. Lead SeaBee program and lead the nuclear research and power unit at McMurdo Station during Operation Deep Freeze.

Politics
Nida Allam (B.S.), Durham County Commissioner and Third Vice Chair of the North Carolina Democratic Party
June Atkinson (Ed.D. Education 1996), former North Carolina Superintendent of Public Instruction
Chris Collins (B.S.M.E. 1972), United States Representative New York 27
John Edwards (B.S. Textile Technology 1974), former Senator, 2004 vice-presidential nominee, and 2008 presidential candidate
Abdurrahim El-Keib (PhD Electrical Engineering, 1984), engineering professor and interim prime minister of Libya 
Oliver Max Gardner (B.S. 1903), lawyer, businessman and Governor of North Carolina from 1929 to 1933
Robert Gibbs (B.A. Political Science), former White House Press Secretary for President Obama
J.D. Hayworth (B.A. Speech Communications and Political Science 1980), member, United States Congress, 6th District, Arizona
James B. Hunt Jr. (B.S. Agricultural Education 1959, M.S. Agricultural Economics 196?), four term Governor of North Carolina
H. Edward Knox (B.S. Agriculture Education 1960), former State Senator and Mayor of Charlotte, North Carolina from 1979 to 1983
Walter B. Jones (attended 1962–1965), member, United States Congress, 3rd District, North Carolina
Robert B. Jordan, III (B.S. Forestry, 1954), Lieutenant Governor of North Carolina (1985–1989)
Saige Martin (M.A. in Art and Design, 2020), one of two first openly gay people, and the first Latinx member, of the Raleigh City Council
Patrick McHenry (attended 1997), member, United States Congress, 10th District, North Carolina
Jonathan Melton (B.A. 2008), one of two first openly-gay members of the Raleigh City Council
Burley Mitchell (B.A. 1966), former North Carolina Supreme Court Chief Justice
Wendell H. Murphy (B.S. Agriculture 1960), former North Carolina Senate member
Rajendra K. Pachauri (M.S. Industrial Engineering 1972, PhD Industrial Engineering and Economics 1975), chaired the Intergovernmental Panel on Climate Change that shared the 2007 Nobel Peace Prize with Al Gore
Hesham Qandil (PhD Biological and Agriculture Engineering), former Prime Minister of Egypt
 Michael Robinson, activist for civil right and human rights
 Glenn Rogers, Member of the Texas House of Representatives (2021–Present)
William Kerr Scott (1917), North Carolina Commissioner of Agriculture, Governor of North Carolina, and United States Senator
Steve Troxler (B.S. Conservation 1974), North Carolina Commissioner of Agriculture and consumer services
Yasonna Laoly, Minister of Law and Human Rights of Indonesia (2014–present)

Science and technology
Marshall Brain (M.S. Computer Science 1989, Instructor 1986–1992), founder of HowStuffWorks
David Carroll (B.S. Physics 1985), Director of the Center for Nanotechnology and Molecular Materials at Wake Forest University 
James Goodnight (B.S. Applied Mathematics 1965, M.S. Experimental Statistics 1968, PhD Statistics 1972, faculty member 1972–1976), CEO of SAS Institute
Terry Hershner (studied Mechanical and Electrical Engineering 1997–2000), electric vehicle advocate and record holder; owner of Off The Grid
Wes Jackson (PhD Genetics 1967), founder of The Land Institute
Paul Jones (B.S. Computer Science), poet and director of ibiblio digital library
Munir Ahmad Khan (M.S. Nuclear Engineering), director of Pakistan's atomic bomb programmes 
Christina Koch (B.S. Electrical Engineering 2001, B.S. Physics 2002, M.S. Electrical Engineering 2002), astronaut
John S. Mayo (B.S., M.S., PhD Electrical Engineering), engineer and seventh president of Bell Labs
Anand Lal Shimpi (B.S. Electrical Engineering 2004), founder of AnandTech
Katharine Stinson (B.S. Mechanical Engineering 1941), first female engineering graduate, first female engineer hired by Federal Aviation Administration
Mark Templeton (Bachelor of Environmental Design 1975), President and CEO of Citrix Systems

Chief executives of the University

Presidents
Alexander Q. Holladay, 1889–1899
George T. Winston, 1899–1908
Daniel H. Hill, Jr., 1908–1916
Wallace Carl Riddick, 1916–1923
Eugene C. Brooks, 1923–1934

Dean of Administration
John W. Harrelson, 1934–1945

Chancellors
John W. Harrelson, 1945–1953
Carey Hoyt Bostian, 1953–1959
John T. Caldwell, 1959–1975
Jackson A. Rigney (interim), 1975
Joab Thomas, 1975–1981
Nash Winstead (interim), 1981–1982
Bruce Poulton, 1982–1989
Larry K. Monteith, 1989–1998
Marye Anne Fox, 1998–2004
Robert A. Barnhardt (interim), 2004
James L. Oblinger, 2005–2009
James H. Woodward (interim), 2009–2010
William R. Woodson, 2010–present

References

North Carolina State University people